Espidar (also Romanized as Espīdār; also known as Espīdārak and Espīdārok) is a village in Pishkuh Rural District, in the Central District of Taft County, Yazd Province, Iran. At the 2006 census, its population was 8, in 5 families.

References 

Populated places in Taft County